Sevapuri is a constituency of the Uttar Pradesh Legislative Assembly covering the city of Sevapuri in the Varanasi district of Uttar Pradesh, India.

Sevapuri is one of five assembly constituencies in the Varanasi Lok Sabha constituency. Since 2008, this assembly constituency is numbered 391 amongst 403 constituencies.

Members of Legislative Assembly

Election results

2022

2017
Apna Dal (Sonelal) candidate Neel Ratan Singh Patel won in 2017 Uttar Pradesh Legislative Elections defeating Samajwadi Party candidate Surendra Singh Patel by a margin of 49,182 votes.

References

External links
 

Assembly constituencies of Uttar Pradesh
Politics of Varanasi district